Benjamin Rosenberger (born 15 June 1996) is an Austrian professional footballer who plays as a midfielder for Grazer AK.

References

1996 births
Living people
Austrian footballers
Austria youth international footballers
Austrian Football Bundesliga players
2. Liga (Austria) players
SK Sturm Graz players
Wolfsberger AC players
Kapfenberger SV players
Grazer AK players
Footballers from Graz
Association football midfielders